The Nahunta Subdivision is a railroad line owned by CSX Transportation in Florida and Georgia. At its north end it continues south from the Savannah Subdivision and at its south end it continues south as the Jacksonville Terminal Subdivision A-Line. The line is double-tracked from Folkston, Georgia south. All of Amtrak's Florida service also traverses the line.

The segment of the line from Folkston to Callahan, Florida, is sometimes informally known as the Folkston Funnel by rail enthusiasts since nearly all of CSX's traffic from the midwest and the northeast to Florida converge on that segment, which carries roughly 40–45 trains a day.  The Folkston Railfan Platform was built in 2001 by the city for viewing trains.

History

The segment of the Nahunta Subdivision north of Jesup, Georgia, was originally part of the Atlantic and Gulf Railroad, which was chartered in 1856 (five years before the start of the American Civil War).  The Atlantic and Gulf Railroad went bankrupt in 1877 and was bought by Henry B. Plant two years later.  Plant incorporated it into his Savannah, Florida, and Western Railway (the main line of the Plant System).

From Folkston, Georgia, south to Jacksonville, Florida, the line was part of the Waycross and Florida Railway and the East Florida Railway.  Those two lines, which were chartered by Henry Plant in 1880, began service in 1881.

The middle segment of the Nahunta Subdivision was built as the Plant System's Folkston Cutoff in 1901.  It was built to provide a shortcut and bypass to Waycross, Georgia.

In 1902, the Plant System became part of the Atlantic Coast Line Railroad, with what is now the Nahunta Subdivision becoming part of the Coast Line's main line.  Though Atlantic Coast Line became part of CSX Transportation through various mergers from 1967 to 1986.  The Nahunta Subdivision continues to be part of CSX's A Line (the designation for the former Atlantic Coast Line main line).

See also
 List of CSX Transportation lines

References

CSX Transportation lines
Rail infrastructure in Florida
Rail infrastructure in Georgia (U.S. state)